Jackie Sibblies Drury is an American playwright. The New York Times called Drury's 2012 play We Are Proud to Present a Presentation About the Herero of Namibia, Formerly Known as Southwest Africa, From the German Sudwestafrika, Between the Years 1884-1915 "her breakout work". Her subsequent works include Social Creatures (2013) and Fairview (2018); for the latter, Drury received the 2019 Pulitzer Prize for Drama.

Early life and education 
Jackie Sibblies Drury was raised by her Jamaican immigrant mother and grandmother in Plainfield, New Jersey. Drury's mother enrolled her at a private school in New Jersey where she witnessed the persistence of "segregation even in a harmonious community."

Drury attended Yale University, where she majored in literature. She received her MFA in playwriting from Brown University in 2010.

Works

Full-length plays
We Are Proud to Present a Presentation About the Herero of Namibia, Formerly Known as Southwest Africa, From the German Sudwestafrika, Between the Years 1884–1915 (2012)
Social Creatures (2013)
Really (2016)
Fairview (2018)
Marys Seacole (2019)

Awards and honors
She was a winner of the Windham-Campbell Literature Prize for Drama in 2015.

She was awarded the 2019 Susan Smith Blackburn Prize for her play Fairview. The prize has a cash award of $25,000. Fairview was presented Off-Broadway in 2018 by Berkeley Repertory Theatre and Soho Rep.

Fairview was also awarded the 2019 Pulitzer Prize for Drama for this "hard-hitting drama that examines race in a highly conceptual, layered structure, ultimately bringing audiences into the actors’ community to face deep-seated prejudices."

She received the 2019 Steinberg Playwright Award for Fairview, which includes a $50,000 cash prize.

Drury received PEN/Laura Pels International Foundation for Theatre Award in 2022.

References

External links
Jackie Sibblies Drury Internet Off-Broadway database
AO International Agency

African-American dramatists and playwrights
21st-century American dramatists and playwrights
Living people
American women dramatists and playwrights
21st-century American women writers
Brown University alumni
Pulitzer Prize for Drama winners
Writers from Plainfield, New Jersey
Year of birth missing (living people)
21st-century African-American women writers
21st-century African-American writers